John Steven McGroarty (August 20, 1862 – August 7, 1944) was a  poet, Los Angeles Times columnist, and author who also served two terms as a Democratic Congressman from California from 1935 to 1939.



Biography
Born at Buck Mountain, in Foster Township, Luzerne County, Pennsylvania (near Wilkes-Barre), McGroarty was the youngest of 12 children. He was educated at public schools and Harry Hillman Academy in Wilkes-Barre, and was employed as treasurer of Luzerne County from 1890 to 1893.  He later studied law and was admitted to the bar in 1894 and commenced practice in Wilkes-Barre.

McGroarty then moved to Montana and was employed in an executive position with the Anaconda Copper Mining Company at Butte and Anaconda from 1896–1901. Afterward he moved to Los Angeles, California in 1901 and engaged in journalism. In 1909, McGroarty edited a LA Times centenary edition of Lincoln's birth with an introspective on black people in Los Angeles.  He became a "beloved figure in black Los Angeles" for his broad-minded views. McGroarty authored numerous books and dramas, one of his best-known works being The Mission Play (1911), a three-hour pageant describing the California Missions from their founding in 1769 through secularization in 1834, ending with their "final ruin" in 1847. The play opened on April 29, 1912. McGroarty also penned California: Its History and Romance in 1911 and Mission Memories in 1929. In his  book the California Plutarch, 1935, he detailed the lives and histories of Northern and Southern California's early pioneers such as the Crocker,  Carrillo, Van Nuys, Stanford, Avila, Estrada, Sepulveda, Baldwin  and Mulholland families. Besides, he was also the editor of the West Coast Magazine for a long time.

McGroarty was designated poet laureate of California by the State legislature in 1933. He was elected to the 74th Congress (January 3, 1935 – January 3, 1937), where he played a large factor in introducing the Townsend Bill to the legislature; McGroarty was reelected to the 75th Congress (January 3, 1937 – January 3, 1939), but was not selected as a candidate for renomination in 1938; he was also unsuccessful at securing the Democratic nomination for Secretary of State of California that same year. After his brief stint in politics, McGroarty resumed the profession of journalism in Tujunga, California. McGroarty died in St. Vincent's Hospital in Los Angeles, California on August 7, 1944, at the age of 81, and was interred at Calvary Cemetery.

He lived in Tujunga, California, in a house known as Chupa Rosa, that he built himself and completed in 1923 in what was at the time the unincorporated community of Sunland which became the City of Tujunga in 1925 and then a part of the City of Los Angeles in 1932.
The building is now Historic Cultural Monument No. 63 of the City of Los Angeles and is known as the McGroarty Arts Center located at 7570 McGroarty Terrace, Tujunga, CA 91042. It offers instruction in art, music, and performance and hosts cultural events.

Quotes

 "The plays could be made most touching and instructive at the same time, without connecting the Fathers in an unholy way with everlasting, silly femininity, as some would-be poets have done with no foundation in fact, but merely as a manifestation of their own unclean dreams, Godspeed to your work in that line."— Father Zephyrin Engelhardt to John S. McGroarty regarding his work on The Mission Play, 1910.
 "The story of Junipero Serra and the Missions for dramatic purposes has been lying around since 1833, at least, for anybody to grab. But no one grabbed it until I did so in 1912. Now it is mine."—  John McGroarty to Charles F. Lummis regarding The Mission Play, 1916.
 "Both as Business and Art, it is intolerable to have in your beautiful pageant some of the frightful anachronisms now there. The Babbits don’t realize them; but every once in a great while someone will go to see the Mission Play who will know that Father Serra didn’t teach the California Indians to weave dam [sic] bad Navajo blankets!"—  Charles F. Lummis to John McGroarty regarding The Mission Play, 1926.
 "One of the countless drawbacks of being in Congress is that I am compelled to receive impertinent letters from a jackass like you in which you say I promised to have the Sierra Madre mountains reforested and I have been in Congress two months and haven't done it. Will you please take two running jumps and go to hell." — Letter from John McGroarty to a constituent in 1934. Quoted by President John F. Kennedy in Profiles in Courage, 1956.

See also
 United States congressional delegations from California
 M.V. Hartranft, speaker at the dedication of Mount McGroarty

Notes

External links

 John Steven McGroarty: A Biographical Sketch
 The Mission Play
 McGroarty Arts Center
  (U.S. Congress)
 

1862 births
1944 deaths
Democratic Party members of the United States House of Representatives from California
Poets Laureate of California
Poets from California